Bodenheim station is a railway station in the municipality of Bodenheim, located in the Mainz-Bingen district in Rhineland-Palatinate, Germany.

References

Railway stations in Rhineland-Palatinate
Buildings and structures in Mainz-Bingen